Gabata may refer to:

 Gabata, a trade name for Gabapentin
 Gabata, a mancala game played in Ethiopia